Ronald Thomas Rhodes (17 November 1932 – 24 May 2021) was an Australian rules footballer who played with Carlton in the Victorian Football League (VFL).

Notes

External links 

Ron Rhodes's profile at Blueseum

1932 births
2021 deaths
Carlton Football Club players
Australian rules footballers from Victoria (Australia)